Natural isotopes are either stable isotopes or radioactive isotopes that have a sufficiently long half-life to allow them to exist in substantial concentrations in the Earth (such as bismuth-209, with a half-life of 1.9 years, potassium-40 with a half-life of 1.251(3) years), daughter products of those isotopes (such as 234Th, with a half-life of 24 days) or cosmogenic elements. The heaviest stable isotope is lead-208, but the heaviest 'natural' isotope is U-238.

Many elements have both natural and artificial isotopes. For example, hydrogen has three natural isotopes and another four known artificial isotopes. A further distinction among stable natural isotopes is division into primordial (existed when the Solar System formed) and cosmogenic elements (created by cosmic ray bombardment or other similar processes).

What defines a natural isotope 
Natural isotopes must be either stable, have a half-life exceeding about 7 years (there are 34 isotopes in this category, see stable isotope for more details) or are generated in large amounts cosmogenically (such as 14C, which has a half life of only 6000 years but is made by cosmic rays colliding with 14N).

Naturally occurring radioisotopes 
Some radioisotopes occur in nature with a half-life of less than 7 years (carbon-14: 5,730 ± 40 years, tritium: 12.32 years etc.). They are synthesised all the time by cosmic radiation. A practical use is radiocarbon dating with carbon-14.

See also 
 Stable isotope
 Environmental isotopes

Bibliography 

Isotopes